HD 154857 b is an extrasolar planet approximately 224 light years away in the constellation of Ara. This is a gas giant mass that orbits the star in an eccentric orbit. This planet was detected by using Anglo-Australian Telescope (AAT) UCLE spectrometer.

References

External links
 
 Simulation HD 154857 b
 news.bbc.co.uk

Ara (constellation)
Exoplanets discovered in 2004
Giant planets
Exoplanets detected by radial velocity